Twin Lakes are a pair of lakes on the west side of Mount Price in El Dorado County, California, in the Desolation Wilderness.

The lakes are known for their spectacular environment for hiking, in a stark granite landscape.

References

Lakes of El Dorado County, California
Wilderness areas of California